Agnolo di Tura (14th century) was a chronicler from Siena, Italy. He was also a shoemaker and tax collector. He married a woman named Nicoluccia, who was of a higher class than he was. Agnolo di Tura was determined to rise in the world (his wife kept reminding him of how much she gave up to be with a man of lower status). Together Agnolo and Nicoluccia had five children. During the time of the Black Death which arrived in Siena in May 1348, Nicoluccia and all five children died. Agnolo di Tura survived the Black Death and remarried.

He wrote:

Resources 
 Book
 Book 
Course
 Plaque
 History

Writers from Siena
Italian chroniclers
14th-century Italian historians